David Wayne Dugan (born 1960) is a United States district judge of the United States District Court for the Southern District of Illinois.

Education 

Dugan earned his Bachelor of Arts from Eastern Illinois University and his Juris Doctor from the Valparaiso University School of Law.

Career 

Before becoming a state court judge, Dugan was in private practice for more than 30 years, where his practice focused on personal injury and commercial litigation in both state and federal courts.

State judicial service 

On February 9, 2017, Dugan was appointed by the Supreme Court of Illinois to be a Circuit Judge for the Third Judicial Circuit. He filled the vacancy left by John B. Barberis Jr., who was appointed to the Illinois Appellate Court. The appointment took effect March 3, 2017. Dugan's service on the state court bench ended when he became a federal district judge.

Federal judicial service 

On February 5, 2020, President Donald Trump announced his intent to nominate Dugan to serve as a United States district judge of the United States District Court for the Southern District of Illinois. On February 12, 2020, his nomination was sent to the Senate. President Trump nominated Dugan to the seat vacated by Judge David R. Herndon, who retired on January 7, 2019. A hearing on his nomination before the Senate Judiciary Committee was held on June 24, 2020. On July 30, 2020, his nomination was reported out of committee by a 13–9 vote. On September 16, 2020, the United States Senate invoked cloture on his nomination by a 56–40 vote. His nomination was confirmed later that day by a 55–41 vote. He received his judicial commission on September 23, 2020.

Memberships 

Dugan was a member of the Alliance Defending Freedom from 2014 to 2016. He has been a member of the National Rifle Association since 2008, the NAACP since 2017, and the Federalist Society since 2017.

References

External links 
 
 

|-

1960 births
Living people
20th-century American lawyers
21st-century American lawyers
21st-century American judges
Eastern Illinois University alumni
Federalist Society members
Illinois lawyers
Illinois Republicans
Illinois state court judges
Judges of the United States District Court for the Southern District of Illinois
People from Litchfield, Illinois
United States district court judges appointed by Donald Trump
Valparaiso University School of Law alumni
Hispanic and Latino American judges